This is a List of Quartermaster units of the United States Army from the Quartermaster Corps.

Brigades

Battalions

Companies

Detachments

References

Quartermaster units and formations of the United States Army
Quartmaster